Jim Dines is an American retired politician and attorney who served as a member of the New Mexico House of Representatives from January 20, 2015, to December 31, 2018.

Education 
Dines earned a Bachelor of Arts degree from University of New Mexico in 1969 and a Juris Doctor from the University of New Mexico School of Law in 1972.

Career 
Dines worked as an attorney for 39 years, including 24 as the owner of an independent law firm. Dines was elected to the New Mexico House of Representatives in November 2014 and assumed office on January 20, 2015. Dines served in the House for two terms before he was narrowly defeated by Democratic nominee Abbas Akhil in the November 2018 election. In January 2018, Dines was one of eight legislators who developed and expanded new sexual assault and harassment policies for members and employees of the New Mexico Legislature.

References 

Living people
Republican Party members of the New Mexico House of Representatives
University of New Mexico alumni
University of New Mexico School of Law alumni
New Mexico lawyers
Year of birth missing (living people)